The Ukrainian Canadian Research & Documentation Centre (UCRDC) is a community center which collects, catalogs, and preserves material documenting the history, culture and contributions of Ukrainians throughout the world. UCRDC produces documentary films, such as the 2003 Between Hitler and Stalin, prepares educational materials, and sponsors lectures, conferences and exhibits on various topics related to Ukrainian issues.

UCRDC is a non-profit organization which seeks community support through various fundraising activities. The Center functions as a resource location which, according to its website, "holds an archive, a small library, oral histories (both in audio and video format), photographs, memoirs, personal archives and other miscellaneous items."

Contact information 
The UCRDC is located at 620 Spadina Avenue, Toronto, Ontario, Canada.

External links 
Official website of UCRDC
Ukrainians Assisting Jews During the Holocaust Project

Ukrainian museums in Canada
Museums in Toronto